2KA was an Australian radio station, licensed to Katoomba, New South Wales, and serving the Blue Mountains area of western Sydney. It was launched on 7 September 1935.

In December 1937 the station moved from 1160 kHz to 780 kHz. A repeater station on 1480 kHz was added in 1978.  From November 1978, the station transmitted on 783 kHz on the AM band, with a translator station on 1476 kHz at Emu Plains.

Before the station launched its Emu Plains based translator in the late 1970s, it was exclusively a Blue Mountains based licence. The new frequency, 1476 kHz, enabled programmers to extend the audience reach to Penrith, and draw revenue from businesses in the area. To combat the potential damage to their Sydney audiences at the time, a number of Sydney radio stations bought the licence and experimented with various automated technologies, none of which were seriously designed to draw mass audiences.

Australian television personality Mike Walsh bought the license in 1983, and worked to advance his vision of developing a successful business model and innovative entertainment product.

The station, which had been broadcasting from a studio in Borec House, at the corner of Station Street and Henry Street in Penrith, developed a new studio at the intersection of Henry and Lawson Streets. It adjoined a cinema complex, which was also owned by Walsh.

On 26 October 1990 at 13:00 hrs., it converted to the FM band and became One FM, and later 96.1FM. The station had paid just $46,000 dollars to convert to the FM band, which was considered a bargain, noting it covered a considerable area of Sydney, and the record amounts of money being paid by other AM stations to convert to FM. In order to be granted the licence the owners, 'Hayden Nepean Broadcasting', had to agree to comply with regulations regarding local content and the stations overall focus on the local community.

The license for the station was sold by Walsh in 1997 to the Australian Radio Network (ARN).

The service provided by the original licence (after its conversion from AM to FM) is now known as Edge 96.1, owned by Australian Radio Network since 1997.

2KA Relaunch

In 2021, 2KA was resurrected by Noise FM Pty Ltd, who acquired the callsign from the Australian Communications and Media Authority (ACMA) to relaunch the 2KA brand for their narrowcast radio network covering the Blue Mountains on FM 87.8 and 87.6 MHz. 2KA's test transmissions commenced in late November 2021 and included Christmas Music ahead of an official launch planned for the 1st of January 2022.

2KA Personalities and Roll Call

From 1967 until 1993, 2KA broadcast all of the Penrith Panthers rugby league games live. By far the longest serving of the commentators was the late Frank Ley, who broadcast the games from the mid-1970s until his retirement in 1989. David Aldred who called North Queensland Foley Shield Rugby League Football on the ABC and horse racing in Queensland in the early 1980s was a co-commentator with Frank Ley in 1987–1988. Brian Sanders took over the calling from Frank, and appointed former Penrith and Canterbury player Darryl Brohman as his expert analyst. Brohman is now with 2GB's Continuous Call Team.

Former announcers include:
Peter Hand
Leon Byner (5AA Adelaide Mornings)
Ron Casey (deceased)
Ward Austin (deceased)
Reg Dowton
Richard Mercer
Shon Walker
Rob Gooda
Kerryn Bancs
Mark Wyman
Warren Purchase
John O'Callahan
Peter Rumble
Donn Berghofer
Mike Bedford
Pete Wagstaff UK
Keith McGowan (deceased)
Richard Perno

From 1976 to 1978:
Malcolm Lees
Vance Green
Gerry Hallahan (deceased)
Ray Grech
Greg King
John Bond (Bamborough)
 Rick Page (Manager)

References

add John Rogers to newsreaders – 1978

External links
 2KA

Radio stations in Sydney
Radio stations in New South Wales
Country radio stations in Australia
Radio stations established in 1935
Radio stations disestablished in 1990
2KA